Oliver Reynolds Davis (born January 1972) is an English writer, composer, pianist and singer.

Early life and studies 

Davis studied at the Royal Academy of Music, graduating in 1994. He has since composed and produced albums, soundtracks, concertos and television scores working with London orchestras such as the London Symphony Orchestra.

Composition 

Oliver Davis graduated from the Royal Academy of Music in 1994. He has composed numerous works for stage and concert hall with much of his work concentrated on his series of albums which feature the LSO and RPO orchestras, his latest album reaching no.1 in the iTunes Classical Charts. He has worked with many leading ballet companies including The Royal Ballet, San Francisco Ballet and New York City Ballet. In addition, Oliver has scored feature films and over 15 Television series.

Credits

Albums

Films and animation

Television Series

Ballet

Instrumental Works

Orchestra

Soloist(s) and Orchestra

Soloist(s) and Large Ensemble (7 or more players)

Works for 2–6 Players

Solo Keyboard(s)

Chorus a cappella / Chorus plus 1 instrument

Chorus and Orchestra/Ensemble

Solo Voice(s) and up to 6 players

Sound Design

Musicals

References 

English composers
1972 births
Alumni of the Royal Academy of Music
Living people